B. A. D. was a former Taiwanese boy band whose members are Ben Pai, Alex Tien, and Danny Huang. The group's name derives from the initials of the members' given name. Pai, Tien, and Huang met at a singing competition in Los Angeles, and began working together in the spring of 1998. The trio was recommended to Liu Wei-tz'u, a manager who eventually sent them to Taiwan to work with EMI.

Under EMI, the trio released their debut studio album, Not Quiet, on 30 December 2000. Although B.A.D's début went under the radar, their second album, released in November 2001, put the group into the spotlight. That album, All I..., earned a Best Group Award at the 13th Golden Melody Awards and a nomination for Best New Artist at the 8th CMA Awards. In 2003, B.A.D. was nominated again for Best Group at the Golden Melody Awards, but lost to S.H.E.

Members
The members of B.A.D. grew up in Taiwan prior to studying in the United States. Ben Pai, born 2 August 1979, attended California State University, Los Angeles during his tenure with the group. Alex Tien, born 12 September 1979, attended the University of Southern California during his time with the group, and graduated in June 2002. Danny Huang, born 9 July 1978, was a student at the Musicians Institute. For most B.A.D. tracks, Pai sings the high notes, Tien sings the middle notes, and Huang sings the low notes.

Discography
 Not Quiet (December 2000)
 All I... (November 2001)
 Song To My Lovely Queen (November 2002)
 Beginning of My Dream (December 2003)
 B.A.D (December 2004)

Awards and nominations
At the 3rd Global Chinese Music Awards, two songs—"Half an Ocean" and "Kingston's Dream"—combined to form B.A.D.'s nomination for Best Group. Best Group honours were ultimately won by Yu Quan, who won the Bronze Award, Twins and S.H.E, who shared the Silver, and F4, who won the Gold Award.

References

Taiwanese boy bands